Sinéad Gleeson is an Irish writer, editor and freelance broadcaster. She has won the Irish Book Award.

Career
Having edited the work of others, in 2016's The Long Gaze Back and 2017's The Glass Shore, she released her first book Constellations, a collection of personal essays, in 2019. Some of the essays in this work document Gleeson's struggle through illness, she is a survivor of Acute promyelocytic leukemia and has had a hip replacement.

Gleeson has been a book and music reviewer for The Irish Times' The Ticket arts supplement and presents The Book Show on RTÉ Radio 1. She has been a judge for the Choice Music Prize. She is a writer in residence at University College Dublin.

Works
As editor
Silver Threads of Hope, New Island Books, 2012 , in aid of Console
The Long Gaze Back: An Anthology of Irish Women Writers, New Island Books, 2016 
 winner 2015 Best Irish Published Book of the Year Irish Book Awards
 2018 Dublin City Public Libraries and Archive's One City One Book
The Glass Shore: Short Stories by Woman Writers from the North of Ireland , winner 2016 TheJournal.ie Best Irish Published Book of the Year, Irish Book Awards
The Art of the Glimpse: 100 Irish Short Stories, 2020 ISBN 9781788548809
This Woman's Work: Essays on Music, Hachette Books, 2022,  (with Kim Gordon)

As author
Constellations, Picador books, 2019 Essay collection  Houghton Mifflin March 2020 in USA

As contributor
 A Little Unsteadily Into Light (2022, New Island Books)

References

External links

Irish book editors
Irish literary critics
Women literary critics
Irish music critics
Irish women critics
Irish women essayists
Irish essayists
Living people
Date of birth missing (living people)
Year of birth missing (living people)